Dominique Archie (born August 19, 1987) is an American professional basketball player who last played for Élan Béarnais Pau-Orthez for the French Pro A. He played college basketball for the University of South Carolina before playing professionally in the D-League and later in Romania, Italy, Belgium and Israel.

Early life and college career
Archie attended T. W. Josey High School in Augusta, Georgia. He played college basketball for the South Carolina Gamecocks.

As a freshman in college, Archie was named to the All-Freshman Team of the Southeastern Conference. In his junior year, Archie was named to the All-SEC Second Team and also to the SEC All-Defensive team.

Professional career
On November 1, 2010, Archie was selected with the 14th overall pick in the 2010 NBA D-League by the Austin Toros. On January 6, 2011, The Austin Toros placed Archie on waivers due to injury.

On July 18, 2011, Archie signed a two-year deal with the Romanian team Timișoara. In his first year with the team, he helped Timișoara reach the 2012 Romanian League Finals, where they eventually lost to CSU Ploiești.

On July 15, 2013, Archie signed with the Italian team Orlandina Basket for the 2013–14 season. That season, Archie led Orlandina win the 2014 Serie A2 Championship, earning a promotion to the Serie A.

On July 21, 2014, Archie signed a two-year contract extension with Orlandina. However, On April 12, 2015, Archie parted ways with Orlandina to join the Belgian team Oostende for the remainder of the season. Archie helped Oostende win the 2015 Belgian League Championship.

On June 5, 2015, Archie signed a one-year contract extension with Oostende. That season, Archie helped Oostende win the Belgian League Championship and the Belgian Cup titles.

On June 17, 2016, Archie returned to Orlandina for a second stint, signing a one-year contract.

On June 17, 2017, Archie signed with the Israeli team Bnei Herzliya for the 2017–18 season. On April 30, 2018, Archie recorded a season-high 22 points, shooting 6-of-7 from three-point range, along with five rebounds, two steals and two assists in an 82–83 loss to Ironi Nahariya.

On June 13, 2018, Archie returned to Italy for a third stint, signing a one-year deal with Pallacanestro Varese. On March 31, 2019, Archie recorded a season-high 24 points, shooting 10-of-12 from the field, along with three rebounds, leading Varese to an 87–79 win over Reyer Venezia. Archie helped Varese reach the 2019 FIBA Europe Cup Semifinals, where they eventually were eliminated by s.Oliver Würzburg.

On June 19, 2019, Archie signed with the French team Champagne Chalons-Reims Basket for the 2019–20 season. He re-signed with the team on June 2, 2020.

On April 23, 2021, Archie signed with the Ottawa Blackjacks in the Canadian Elite Basketball League.

On July 28, 2021, he has signed with Élan Béarnais Pau-Orthez for the French Pro A.

Career statistics

Domestic Leagues

|-
| style="text-align:center;" | 2010–11
| style="text-align:left;" rowspan=1| Austin Toros
| style="text-align:center;" rowspan=1| D-League
|| 15 || 18.6 || .392 || .214 || .857 || 3.2 || 1.0 || .4 || .3 || 5.4
|-
| style="text-align:center;" | 2011–12
| style="text-align:left;" rowspan=2| Timișoara
| style="text-align:center;" rowspan=2| Liga Națională
|| 40 || 36.3 || .455 || .409 || .771 || 7.1 || 1.9 || 1.7 || 1.0 || 13.5
|-
| style="text-align:center;" | 2012–13
|| 32 || 32.5 || .489 || .357 || .717 || 5.0 || 3.0 || 1.0 || 1.1 || 13
|-
| style="text-align:center;" | 2013–14
| style="text-align:left;" rowspan=2| Orlandina
| style="text-align:center;" rowspan=1| Serie A2
|| 41 ||  33.3 || .522 || .364 || .732 || 6.9 || 1.5 || 1.1 || 1.0 || 15.4
|-
| style="text-align:center;" | 2014–15
| style="text-align:center;" rowspan=1| Serie A
|| 26 || 32.5 || .452 || .381 || .736 || 6.3 || 1.3 || .8 || .3 || 13.1
|-
| style="text-align:center;" | 2015
| style="text-align:left;" rowspan=2| Oostende
| style="text-align:center;" rowspan=2| BLB Division 1
|| 14 || 17.7 || .567 || .517 || .731 || 3.2 || .7 || .9 || .2 || 7.8
|-
| style="text-align:center;" | 2015–16
|| 39 || 17.7 || .569 || .537 || .653 || 3.1 || .9 || .7 || .3 || 7.2
|-
| style="text-align:center;" | 2016–17
| style="text-align:left;" rowspan=1| Orlandina
| style="text-align:center;" rowspan=1| Serie A
|| 27 || 31.1 || .494 || .421 || .763 || 5.5 || 1.0 || 1.3 || .9 || 13.7
|-
| style="text-align:center;" | 2017–18
| style="text-align:left;" rowspan=1| Herzliya
| style="text-align:center;" rowspan=1| IPL
|| 33 || 25.8 || .442 || .355 || .632|| 4.4 || 1.5 || .8 || .8 || 8.5
|-
| style="text-align:center;" | 2018–19
| style="text-align:left;" rowspan=1| Varese
| style="text-align:center;" rowspan=1| Serie A
|| 28 || 26.6 || .428 || .338 || .723 || 4.6 || 1.5 || 1.0 || .5 || 11.2
|-
|}
Source: RealGM

References

External links
 RealGM profile

1987 births
Living people
American expatriate basketball people in Belgium
American expatriate basketball people in Israel
American expatriate basketball people in Italy
American expatriate basketball people in Romania
American men's basketball players
Austin Spurs players
Basketball players from Augusta, Georgia
BC Oostende players
Bnei Hertzeliya basketball players
Champagne Châlons-Reims Basket players
Élan Béarnais players
Forwards (basketball)
Lega Basket Serie A players
Orlandina Basket players
Pallacanestro Varese players
South Carolina Gamecocks men's basketball players